Rohit Danu (born 10 July 2002) is an Indian professional footballer who plays as a forward for the Indian Super League club  Hyderabad .

Club career

Early career 
Danu joined the AIFF Elite Academy in 2015 under Bibiano Fernandes, where he was picked to represent India in various youth levels. At the age of 15, he would have been the youngest player of India national U17 team which played 2017 FIFA U-17 World Cup. Danu, the youngest member in the Indian camp, joined the team after the Portuguese manager Luís Norton de Matos became impressed with his dribbling ability and maturity at such a young age. However, Danu suffered an ankle injury after joining the squad and the manager decided against naming him in the final 21-man squad.

Due to injury, Danu was not even registered for the 2018 AFC U-16 Championship qualifiers.
But later, after India qualifying to 2018 AFC U-16 Championship, he was part of the u16 team, playing friendlies in exposure trips. However, Danu could not make it to final squad of 2018 AFC U-16 Championship because the rule says that to play 2018 AFC U-16 Championship, a player must be born after 1 January 2002 and registered in the qualifiers. If not registered for qualifiers, the player must born after 1 September 2002. Unfortunately birth date of Rohit Danu is 10 July 2002. Since he was not registered in the qualifiers due to injury, he was not eligible for the 2018 AFC U-16 Championship.

Indian Arrows 

On 5 January 2019, at the age of 16 years, 5 months and 27 days, Rohit Danu has beaten his fellow team-mate Jitendra Singh's record of being the youngest ever goal scorer in the I-League and Indian top flight overall . The 16-year-old scored in the 14th minute against Aizawl FC at the Rajiv Gandhi Stadium.

Hyderabad 

On 16 October 2020, Danu joined Indian Super League club Hyderabad on a three-year deal, making it his first ever professional contract with a top-tier club. On 15 December 2020, he made his ISL debut for Hyderabad against East Bengal. He came on as a 77th-minute substitute for the Hitesh Sharma as Hyderabad won the match for 3–2. On 27 November 2021, Danu scored his first ever ISL goal in a 3–1 victory against Mumbai City.

Career statistics

Club

Notes

International

Honours 
Hyderabad
 Indian Super League: 2021–22

References

External links
Rohit Danu at Indian Super League official website

2002 births
Living people
People from Bageshwar
Footballers from Uttarakhand
Indian footballers
India youth international footballers
Association football forwards
Indian Arrows players
I-League players
Indian Super League players
Hyderabad FC players